Maua may refer to:

Places 
 Maua, Kenya
 Mauá, São Paulo, Brazil
 Maúa District, Niassa Province, Mozambique

Other uses 
 Maua (cicada), a genus of cicada
 Elma Maua (1948–2010), New Zealand journalist and editor
 Xylosma hawaiensis, a tree endemic to Hawaii